Grand Ayatollah Sayyid Ahmad Hassani Baghdadi  (Arabic:  السيد أحمد الحسني البغدادي) (born 1945) is an Iraqi Twelver Shi'a Marja.

He currently lives in Najaf, Iraq.  He is the author of numerous Islamic books.

End of the year 2012 he issued a fatwa that Christianity not be tolerated in Iraq. In 2015, he stated regarding Christians and Jews living in Muslim lands: "If they are people of the book (Jews and Christians) we demand of them the jizya and if they refuse, then we fight them. That is if he is Christian. He has three choices: either convert to Islam, or, if he refuses and wishes to remain Christian, then pay the jizya....But if they still refuse, then we fight them, and we abduct their women, and destroy their churches this is Islam!" In regard to polytheists (Hindus, Buddhists, etc.), he stated "As for the polytheists, We allow them to choose between Islam and war!  This is not the opinion of Ahmad al-Husseini al-Baghdadi, but the opinion of all five schools of jurisprudence" (four Sunni: Hanbali, Shafi'i, Maliki, Hanafi; and one Shia: Ja'fari).

Notes

External links
 بيانا حول جرائم التعذيب في سجون العراق
مقابلة مع آية الله أحمد الحسني البغدادي

See also
List of Maraji

Iraqi grand ayatollahs
Iraqi Islamists
Shia Islamists
1944 births
Living people
Anti-Christian sentiment